This is a list of IBF Muay Thai world champions, showing every world champion certificated by the International Boxing Federation Muaythai (IBF Muay Thai). The IBF, which is one of the four major governing bodies in professional boxing,  started certifying their own Muay Thai world champions in late 2017. The IBF is the second boxing organization to start certifying Muay Thai World champions following World Boxing Council (WBC).

Middleweight (160lbs / 72.5kg)

Welterweight (147lbs / 66.7kg)

Junior welterweight

Lightweight (135lbs/ 61.2kg)

Junior lightweight (130lbs /58.9kg)

Mini flyweight (105lbs /47.6kg)

See also 
List of IBF world champions (boxing champions)
List of WBC Muaythai world champions
List of current world Muaythai champions

References

Lists of Muay Thai champions
IBF
Muay Thai